Augustin Souchy Bauer (28 August 1892 – 1 January 1984) was a German anarchist, antimilitarist, labor union official and journalist. He traveled widely and wrote extensively about the Spanish Civil War and intentional communities. He was born in Ratibor, Germany (now Racibórz, Poland).

Bibliography
These are Souchy's works that have been translated into English: 
 The Tragic Week in May, CNT-FAI, 1937 (account of sectarian violence in Spain during the Spanish Revolution)
 With the Peasants of Aragon, Cienfuegos Press, 1982 (Souchy's account of Spanish peasant cooperatives)
 Beware! Anarchist!, Charles H. Kerr, Chicago, 1992 (Souchy's autobiography)
For a more complete listing, see the German Wikipedia article at :de:Augustin Souchy

Further reading

References

External links
 Souchy papers and audio collection at the International Institute of Social History
The Tragic Week in May
Photos of Augustin Souchy

  at Theory and Practice

1892 births
1984 deaths
20th-century German journalists
20th-century German male writers
20th-century German non-fiction writers
Anarchist writers
Anarcho-syndicalists
German anarchists
German anti-capitalists
German anti-war activists
German libertarians
German male journalists
German male non-fiction writers
German opinion journalists
German people of the Spanish Civil War
Libertarian socialists
Members of the Free Workers' Union of Germany
People from the Province of Silesia
People from Racibórz